Dance to the Potshot Record is the fifth album of J-ska band Potshot. The album was released in the United States by Asian Man Records in 2004. This was the last album to come out in the USA. The album was released by Vivid Sound in Japan in 2002.

Track listing
All tracks by Ryoji & Yoko except where noted.

 "To Hell With Potshot" (Ryoji) – 1:11 
 "Seasons End" – 3:15 
 "In Time Now"  – 3:04 
 "Going On" – 2:33 
 "Party" – 2:34 
 "Victory or Lost" – 2:37 
 "Don't Fail to Ride" – 2:33 
 "Silent Time" (Ryoji) – 0:20 
 "About You and Me" – 2:49 
 "Reply" – 2:31 
 "Other Side" – 3:05 
 "Of the Future" – 1:52 
 "In My Heart" – 3:28 
 "Curtain Call" (Ryoji) – 2:51 
 "Spit It Out" – 2:31 
 "Hurt Me More" – 2:25

Personnel 
Chucky – trombone
Katsuya – bass
Shigeo Kikuchi – photography
Mitchy – trumpet
Ryoji – vocals
Satoshi – guitar

References

Potshot (band) albums
2004 albums
Asian Man Records albums